The 1896 VPI football team represented Virginia Agricultural and Mechanical College and Polytechnic Institute in the 1896 college football season. The team was led by their head coach Arlie C. Jones and finished with a record of five wins, two losses, and one tie (5–2–1).

Schedule

Season summary

St. Albans game cancelled
A game against St. Albans Lutheran Boys School was scheduled to be played on October 17, 1896 in Radford, Virginia.  However, the game was not played after a dispute between both teams regarding the amateur eligibility of players on both sides.

Players
The following players were members of the 1896 football team according to the roster published in the 1897 and 1903 editions of The Bugle, the Virginia Tech yearbook.

References

VPI
Virginia Tech Hokies football seasons
VPI football